Donya (Persian: The World) was a monthly Marxist theoretical cultural magazine that produced twelve issues between February 1934 and June 1935. It was based in Tehran, Iran.

History and profile
Donya was first published in February 1934. Three Marxist Iranian intellectuals, Taqi Arani, Iraj Iskandari and Bozorg Alavi, who were part of the first cell of the newly founded Iranian Communist Party were the founders of the magazine. Arani also served as the editor-in-chief of Donya. The magazine was based in Tehran and was published on a monthly basis. 

Its major goal was to introduce Marxism to Iranians and to provide a basis for a prospective Marxist group. Donya featured articles on politics and history from a Marxist perspective. It supported positivist Marxism and cultural hegemony, but avoided direct discussions of Marxism, class struggle and revolution. Instead, it covered indirect discussions of cultural and philosophical views. Donya published a total of 12 volumes before its closure in 1935.

Legacy
A publication with the same name was launched by Tudeh Party in 1960. It billed itself as the direct successor of Donya.

References

External links

1934 establishments in Iran
1935 disestablishments in Iran
Cultural magazines
Defunct magazines published in Iran
Defunct political magazines
Magazines established in 1934
Magazines disestablished in 1935
Magazines published in Tehran
Marxist magazines
Monthly magazines published in Iran
Persian-language magazines
Publications of the Tudeh Party of Iran
Philosophy magazines